Timothy Gregg Bachman (born August 1, 1951) is a Canadian guitarist and vocalist best known for his work with rock bands Brave Belt and Bachman–Turner Overdrive (BTO). Bachman was one of the four founding members of BTO, a group that have sold nearly 30 million albums worldwide and also featured his brothers Randy (guitar/vocals) and Robbie (drums), as well as Fred Turner (bass/vocals).

Career
Tim Bachman had played guitar in a few Winnipeg area bands, some with his younger brother Robbie on drums. He then briefly quit music, feeling that the Winnipeg scene had become stagnant, and he got a job and began attending college. He returned to music in 1972, when older brother Randy was looking to add a second guitar to the Brave Belt lineup. This occurred after the departure of Chad Allan, which left Brave Belt with only three members.

Bachman wrote or co-wrote several songs during his tenure with Brave Belt and BTO, including "Put It in a Song" (with Turner) for the Brave Belt II album, "Down and Out Man" (with R. B. Charles) for the first BTO album, and "Blown" (with Randy) and "I Don't Have To Hide" for Bachman–Turner Overdrive II.

Bachman left BTO in 1974, shortly after the release of Bachman–Turner Overdrive II, to spend more time with his family and to work on concert promotion, although his brothers claim that he was fired for breaking Randy Bachman's lifestyle rules on the road (including no alcohol and drugs). He was replaced by Blair Thornton.

He rejoined BTO (along with Randy Bachman, Fred Turner and Garry Peterson) for a 1984 reunion album and supporting tours, including a high-profile world tour opening for Van Halen. He then led touring versions of the band in 1987 and 1988.

Personal life
Bachman is the father of blues/rock guitarist Paxton Bachman and the uncle of musician Tal Bachman, who is Randy Bachman's son.

Bachman now lives in the Fraser Valley in British Columbia, Canada, and has worked as a realtor in Abbotsford since 1991. He was a director of the Fraser Valley Real Estate Board from 2003 to 2008.

In 2008, Tim Bachman suffered a heart attack and subsequently underwent quadruple by-pass surgery.

Sexual offence allegations
On June 14, 2010, Bachman was charged by Abbotsford police with sexual interference of a person under 14, touching a young person for a sexual purpose, and sexual assault. Police recommended a charge of sexual exploitation, but Crown counsel opted to split the case into three separate counts. After an 11-month investigation, police charged Bachman for incidents that allegedly began in Abbotsford in 2000 when the complainant was 11 years old and continued for three years.

Stacy Bohun alleged that Bachman would grope her when she was a foster child living in his home in the Fraser Valley. Bachman was found not guilty on these counts, as Justice Neill Brown ruled that the testimony of Bohun was too unreliable to support a criminal conviction.

On May 26, 2014, Bachman was arrested again by Abbotsford police on new sex charges relating to incidents from the 1990s involving a different underaged victim. He faced charges of sexual assault, sexual interference and invitation to sexual touching. He was released pending trial on conditions which included avoiding contact with anyone under the age of 16, and avoiding any public park, schoolground, daycare, swimming pool or any other facility where minors under 16 may be present. Those charges were stayed on November 19, 2015. A representative of the Criminal Justice Branch could not provide any details regarding why the charges were stayed, but did state that this decision was reached while the prosecutor was preparing for the preliminary inquiry.

External links
1986 interview

References

Bachman–Turner Overdrive members
Living people
Musicians from Winnipeg
Canadian people of German descent
Canadian people of Ukrainian descent
Canadian rock guitarists
Canadian male guitarists
1951 births
Rhythm guitarists